Llangeinor (Welsh: Llangeinwyr) is a small village (and electoral ward) located in the Garw Valley around  north of Bridgend in Bridgend County Borough, Wales. The ward population taken at the 2011 census was 1,243. The entire village is now protected as part of a conservation area.

Economy
IRVIN-GQ, part of Airborne Systems Group, makes parachutes for the military, near the junction of the A4093 with the main road A4064. GQ Parachutes had been formed in 1932.

Governance
At the local level Llangeinor is an electoral ward to Garw Valley Community Council, electing two of the 13 community councillors.

Llangeinor is also an electoral ward for Bridgend County Borough Council, since 1995 electing one county councillor. From 1995 to 2017, it was represented by the Labour Party . From 2004 to 2017, Labour county councillor, Marlene Thomas, represented the ward. In 2012, Thomas was elected Mayor of Bridgend County Borough and served until 2013. Since 2017, the Llangeinor ward has been represented by Cllr. Roz Stirman, who was elected as an independent councillor, but later defected to Plaid Cymru. A 2019 review of electoral wards in the borough by the Boundary Commission for Wales proposes to merge Llangeinor with the southern part of the Pontycymmer ward to form a new ward called Lower Garw.

Transport
The A4064 road runs through the village; to the south this leads to Tondu, and to the north it heads to Pontycymer. The A4093 road starts in the village and heads east over the mountain to the Ogmore Valley. A disused railway runs through the village.

Sport
Llangeinor AFC  play in the Welsh Football League Second Division (as of 2008–09). Their ground is located to the west of the A4064 and river, and south-east of the railway level crossing, and just down the hill from by the main road in.

Notable people
Llangeinor was the home of Richard Price (1723–1791), an internationally influential academic with a notable contribution to the development of free market economics, as well as the mathematical subject of bayesian probability, having edited and published Thomas Bayes work.

References

Villages in Bridgend County Borough
Wards of Bridgend County Borough